Herbert George Billson  (1871–1938) was a British colonial administrator and natural scientist who worked for the Imperial Forestry Service in India and became Chief Conservator of Indian Forests.

Early life 
Herbert Billson was the son of Edwin Billson and he was born in Bedford, England in 1871. He was educated at Bedford Modern School and he studied forestry at the Royal Indian Engineering College at Cooper's Hill, Surrey.

Forestry service
He joined the Imperial Forestry Service in India in 1893 and rose to become Assistant Inspector-General of Forests, Government of India in 1912-13. From 1914-20 he was Conservator of Forests and from 1920-22 Officiating Chief Conservator. In 1922 this position was made permanent and he remained as Chief Conservator of Indian Forests until his retirement in 1926. He also served as a Member of the Legislative Council, United Provinces. He was appointed CIE in the 1925 New Year's Honours.

Rugby
Herbert Billson was a good rugby player; he played one season for Bedford in 1893/4 during which they won 27 out of 29 matches played.

Family life
In 1900 he married Dolly Tulloch. They later settled in Cheltenham, England where Herbert Billson died on 27 October 1938.

References 

1871 births
1938 deaths
People educated at Bedford Modern School
Alumni of the Royal Indian Engineering College
Imperial Forestry Service officers
Companions of the Order of the Indian Empire
Forest administration in India
Bedford Blues players
People from Bedford